This is a list of football clubs in Vietnam.

V.League 1 
 Becamex Binh Duong
 Dong A Thanh Hoa
 Ha Noi
 Ha Noi Police
 Hai Phong
 Ho Chi Minh City
 Hoang Anh Gia Lai
 Hong Linh Ha Tinh
 Khanh Hoa
 SHB Da Nang
 Song Lam Nghe An
 Thep Xanh Nam Dinh
 TopenLand Binh Dinh
 Viettel

V.League 2 
 Ba Ria-Vung Tau
 Binh Phuoc
 Binh Thuan
 Hoa Binh
 Hue
 Long An
 Phu Dong
 Phu Tho
 PVF-Cong An Nhan Dan
 Quang Nam

Vietnamese Football League Second Division 
 Dak Lak
 Dong Nai
 Dong Thap
 Dugong Kien Giang
 Gia Dinh
 Hai Nam Vinh Yen Vinh Phuc
 Ho Chi Minh City Youth
 Lam Dong
 Luxury Ha Long
 PVF
 Quang Nam Youth
 SHB Da Nang Youth
 Tien Giang
 Vinh Long

Vietnamese Football League Third Division 
 An Giang
 Ben Tre
 Can Tho
 Cung Dinh Thap
 Ha Noi Youth
 Ha Noi Police Youth
 Kon Tum
 Long An Youth
 Nutifood Academy
 Phu Yen
 Song Lam Nghe An Youth
 Tay Ninh
 Vi Tri Vang Kon Tum

Vietnamese Women's Football Championship 
 Ha Noi I
 Ha Noi II
 Ho Chi Minh City
 Phong Phu Ha Nam
 Son La
 Thai Nguyen T&T
 Vietnam Coal Minerals

Vietnam
 
Football clubs
Football clubs